Rakovec is a settlement in the Municipality of Šmarje pri Jelšah in eastern Slovenia. It lies in the hills southeast of Grobelno in the northern part of the Kozje region. The entire municipality is part of the historical Styria region and is included in the Savinja Statistical Region.

References

External links
Rakovec at Geopedia

Populated places in the Municipality of Šmarje pri Jelšah